Claudeson Pelon (born November 27, 1992) is a former American football defensive end. He played college football at USC and was signed by the New York Jets as an undrafted free agent in 2016.

Early years
Pelon attended Agape Christian Academy in Orlando, Florida where he was named to the All-Conference team his senior season in 2010. Pelon had 68 tackles with nine sacks during his senior season.

Professional career

New York Jets
On April 30, 2016, Pelon signed with the New York Jets as an undrafted free agent following the conclusion of the 2016 NFL Draft. On September 3, 2016, he was released by the Jets as part of final roster cuts and was signed to the practice squad the next day. He was released from the practice squad on September 19, 2016. He was re-signed to the practice squad on December 7, 2016. He signed a reserve/future contract with the Jets on January 2, 2017.

On September 14, 2017, Pelon was waived by the Jets and was re-signed to the practice squad. He signed a reserve/future contract with the Jets on January 1, 2018.

On June 5, 2018, Pelon was waived/injured by the Jets and placed on injured reserve. He was released on June 12, 2018.

Tennessee Titans
On July 26, 2018, Pelon signed with the Tennessee Titans, but was waived/injured five days later after suffering a torn ACL.

References

External links
USC Trojans bio

Living people
1992 births
Players of American football from Orlando, Florida
American football defensive linemen
USC Trojans football players
New York Jets players
Tennessee Titans players